Langmade Brook is a  long first-order tributary to West Branch Tunungwant Creek. This is the only stream of this name in the United States.

Variant names
According to the Geographic Names Information System, it has also been known historically as:
Cramer Brook

Course

Watershed

See also 
 List of rivers of Pennsylvania

References

Rivers of Pennsylvania
Tributaries of the Allegheny River
Rivers of McKean County, Pennsylvania